Aderus feai is a species of beetles from the family Aderidae, the ant-like leaf beetles. It occurs in Cape Verde. The species was described in 1906 by Maurice Pic, who named it after zoologist Leonardo Fea.

References

Aderidae
Beetles of Africa
Beetles described in 1906
Taxa named by Maurice Pic
Insects of Cape Verde